Juan de Ortega may refer to:
 Juan de Ortega (hermit) (1080–1163), Spanish priest and hermit
 Juan de Ortega (bishop of Coria), bishop from 1479 to 1485
 Juan de Ortega (bishop of Almería), bishop from 1492 to 1515
 Juan de Ortega (mathematician), 16th-century Spanish mathematician

See also
 San Juan de Ortega, a former monastery, now a stopping place on the Camino de Santiago in Spain